Camp Ground Church and Cemetery is a historic church and cemetery located near Milan, Sullivan County, Missouri.  The church was built in 1901, and is a one-story, Classical Revival style rectangular frame building.  It measures 30 feet by 44 feet and rests on a broken ashlar foundation.  The cemetery was founded in 1855 as a public burial ground and contains approximately 400 graves.

It was listed on the National Register of Historic Places in 1985.

References

External links
 

Churches on the National Register of Historic Places in Missouri
Cemeteries on the National Register of Historic Places in Missouri
Neoclassical architecture in Missouri
Churches completed in 1901
1855 establishments in Missouri
Buildings and structures in Sullivan County, Missouri
National Register of Historic Places in Sullivan County, Missouri
Neoclassical church buildings in the United States